Condylostylus is a genus of flies in the family Dolichopodidae. It is the second largest genus in the subfamily Sciapodinae, with more 250 species included. It has a high diversity in the Neotropical realm, where 70% of the species occur.

Gallery

Species

Condylostylus acceptus Parent, 1933
Condylostylus alatus Becker, 1922
Condylostylus albiciliatus (Van Duzee, 1927)
Condylostylus albicoxa (Walker, 1849)
Condylostylus albidipes Wei, 2006
Condylostylus albifrons Parent, 1932
Condylostylus albihirtus (Van Duzee, 1929)
Condylostylus argentatus (Aldrich, 1901)
Condylostylus argentifer Parent, 1929
Condylostylus argentipes Parent, 1929
Condylostylus armipes (Bigot, 1890)
Condylostylus atricauda (Aldrich, 1901)
Condylostylus atrolamellatus (Aldrich, 1901)
Condylostylus atrox Becker, 1922
Condylostylus banksi (Van Duzee, 1915)
Condylostylus barbatulus Becker, 1922
Condylostylus barbatus (Aldrich, 1901)
Condylostylus basilaris (Wiedemann, 1830)
Condylostylus basovi Grichanov, 1998
Condylostylus beckeri Speiser, 1920
Condylostylus bellulus (Aldrich, 1896)
Condylostylus bicolor Zhu & Yang, 2011
Condylostylus bicoloripes (Van Duzee, 1929)
Condylostylus bifasciatus Parent, 1931
Condylostylus bifilus (Van der Wulp, 1891)
Condylostylus bifimbriatus (Aldrich, 1901)
Condylostylus biseta Becker, 1922
Condylostylus bisetosus Parent, 1930
Condylostylus bisinuatus Van Duzee, 1931
Condylostylus bituberculatus (Macquart, 1842)
Condylostylus blepharotarsis Meuffels & Grootaert, 1999
Condylostylus brayi Robinson, 1975
Condylostylus brevihirtus Van Duzee, 1930
Condylostylus brevilamellatus Parent, 1929
Condylostylus brevimanus (Enderlein, 1912)
Condylostylus brevipedis Van Duzee, 1931
Condylostylus brevis Becker, 1922
Condylostylus breviseta (Coquillett, 1902)
Condylostylus brimleyi Robinson, 1964
Condylostylus brunnicosus Frey, 1925
Condylostylus burgeoni Parent, 1935
Condylostylus caesar Becker, 1922
Condylostylus caii Parent, 1934
Condylostylus calcaratus (Loew, 1861)
Condylostylus camptopus Parent, 1928
Condylostylus cancer Van Duzee, 1934
Condylostylus capitulatus Parent, 1929
Condylostylus caudatus (Wiedemann, 1830)
Condylostylus chaineyi Grichanov, 1998
Condylostylus cilitarsis (Van der Wulp, 1888)
Condylostylus cilitibia Parent, 1939
Condylostylus cinctiventris Van Duzee, 1934
Condylostylus clavatus (Van Duzee, 1929)
Condylostylus clavipes (Aldrich, 1901)
Condylostylus clivus Wei & Song, 2005
Condylostylus cochlearis Becker, 1922
Condylostylus coerulus (Macquart in Bigot, 1859)
Condylostylus coloradensis Van Duzee, 1932
Condylostylus comatus (Loew, 1861)
Condylostylus comes Parent, 1933
Condylostylus comorensis Grichanov, 2020
Condylostylus completus Becker, 1922
Condylostylus confluens Becker, 1922
Condylostylus connectans (Curran, 1942)
Condylostylus conspectus Becker, 1922
Condylostylus corculum (Walker, 1849)
Condylostylus cornutus Van Duzee, 1931
Condylostylus coxalis (Aldrich, 1901)
Condylostylus crinicauda Parent, 1929
Condylostylus crinitus (Aldrich, 1904)
Condylostylus ctenopus (Enderlein, 1912)
Condylostylus cylindricus (Van Duzee, 1929)
Condylostylus damingshanus Wang, Zhu & Yang, 2012
Condylostylus danieli Grichanov, 2010
Condylostylus denticulatus Van Duzee, 1931
Condylostylus depressus (Aldrich, 1901)
Condylostylus diffusus (Wiedemann, 1830)
Condylostylus digitiformis Yang, 1998
Condylostylus diminuans Becker, 1922
Condylostylus distinctus Van Duzee, 1931
Condylostylus diversipes Becker, 1922
Condylostylus dives Parent, 1929
Condylostylus dominicensis Robinson, 1975
Condylostylus erectus Becker, 1922
Condylostylus erroneus Grichanov, 2004
Condylostylus exemtus (Walker, 1852)
Condylostylus exquisitus (Walker, 1852)
Condylostylus facetus Parent, 1933
Condylostylus fascinator Parent, 1933
Condylostylus fastuosus Parent, 1933
Condylostylus felix Becker, 1922
Condylostylus fenestratus (Van der Wulp, 1891)
Condylostylus fenestrella Parent, 1933
Condylostylus filiformis Becker, 1922
Condylostylus filipeniculatus (Enderlein, 1912)
Condylostylus fimbriatus Parent, 1928
Condylostylus flagellatus Becker, 1922
Condylostylus flagellipodex Becker, 1922
Condylostylus flavicoxa (Aldrich, 1901)
Condylostylus flavilamellatus Becker, 1922
Condylostylus flavipedus Zhu & Yang, 2011
Condylostylus flavipes (Aldrich, 1904)
Condylostylus floridus Parent, 1939
Condylostylus forcipatus (Aldrich, 1901)
Condylostylus formosus (Parent, 1934)
Condylostylus fraterculus (Enderlein, 1912)
Condylostylus friedmani Grichanov, 2020
Condylostylus fujianensis Yang & Yang, 2003
Condylostylus fupingensis Yang & Saigusa, 2005
Condylostylus furcatus (Van Duzee, 1915)
Condylostylus furcatus Zhu & Yang, 2011 (needs new name)
Condylostylus fuscipennis Van Duzee, 1934
Condylostylus fusitarsis Van Duzee, 1933
Condylostylus galinae Grichanov, 1996
Condylostylus gavryushini Grichanov, 2020
Condylostylus gemma (Bigot, 1890)
Condylostylus geniculatus Yang, 1998
Condylostylus genualis (Aldrich, 1901)
Condylostylus gorgonensis Parent, 1933
Condylostylus gracilis (Aldrich, 1904)
Condylostylus graenicheri (Van Duzee, 1927)
Condylostylus guttula (Wiedemann, 1830)
Condylostylus hamiformis Becker, 1922
Condylostylus helioi Miward de Azevedo, 1976
Condylostylus hirsutus Becker, 1922
Condylostylus hirtipes (Aldrich, 1901)
Condylostylus ignobilis Becker, 1922
Condylostylus ignoratus Becker, 1922
Condylostylus ignotus Becker, 1922
Condylostylus imitator Curran, 1924
Condylostylus impar Becker, 1922
Condylostylus impatiens Becker, 1922
Condylostylus imperator (Aldrich, 1904)
Condylostylus imperialis (Fabricius, 1805)
Condylostylus inermis (Loew, 1861)
Condylostylus inopinatus (Parent, 1933)
Condylostylus inornatus (Aldrich, 1901)
Condylostylus insignitus Parent, 1929
Condylostylus insularis (Aldrich, 1896)
Condylostylus interceptus (Aldrich, 1901)
Condylostylus itoi Kasagi, 2006
Condylostylus japonicus Kasagi, 1984
Condylostylus kaplini Grichanov, 2020
Condylostylus kivuensis Vanschuytbroeck, 1964
Condylostylus latiapicatus (Van Duzee, 1933)
Condylostylus latimanus Van Duzee, 1931
Condylostylus latipennis Parent, 1941
Condylostylus latitarsis (Becker, 1922)
Condylostylus lavatus Parent, 1930
Condylostylus leigongshanus Wei & Yang, 2007
Condylostylus leonardi (Van Duzee, 1915)
Condylostylus lepidopus Frey, 1928
Condylostylus lepidus (Walker, 1852)
Condylostylus libidinosus Parent, 1933
Condylostylus longicaudatus Zhu & Yang, 2011
Condylostylus longicornis (Fabricius, 1775)
Condylostylus longipennis (Van Duzee, 1929)
Condylostylus longitalus (Van Duzee, 1923)
Condylostylus lopesi Miward de Azevedo, 1976
Condylostylus loriferus (Parent, 1934)
Condylostylus lunator Curran, 1925
Condylostylus luteicinctus Parent, 1930
Condylostylus luteicoxa Parent, 1929
Condylostylus lutheri (Frey, 1917)
Condylostylus lutzi Freitas & Lopes, 1941
Condylostylus madagascarensis Grichanov, 2020
Condylostylus melampus (Loew, 1862)
Condylostylus mensor (Van Duzee, 1929)
Condylostylus mireciliatus Parent, 1928
Condylostylus miripennis Parent, 1931
Condylostylus miripes Parent, 1933
Condylostylus mirus Parent, 1931
Condylostylus moniliventris Parent, 1934
Condylostylus mundus (Wiedemann, 1830)
Condylostylus nebulosus (Matsumura, 1916)
Condylostylus nigripilosus Robinson, 1975
Condylostylus nigrofemoratus (Walker, 1849)
Condylostylus nobilissimus (Aldrich, 1901)
Condylostylus nubeculus Becker, 1922
Condylostylus nudifacies Van Duzee, 1930
Condylostylus nudipes Becker, 1922
Condylostylus occidentalis (Bigot, 1888)
Condylostylus ocellatus Parent, 1930
Condylostylus oedipus Becker, 1922
Condylostylus ogilvii (Malloch, 1932)
Condylostylus ornaticauda Van Duzee, 1931
Condylostylus ornatipennis (De Meijere, 1910)
Condylostylus ornatipes Van Duzee, 1931
Condylostylus ornatus Parent, 1931
Condylostylus paraterminalis Dyte, 1975
Condylostylus paricoxa Parent, 1939
Condylostylus patellitarsis Becker, 1922
Condylostylus pateraeformis Becker, 1923
Condylostylus patibulatus (Say, 1823)
Condylostylus pectinator Parent, 1930
Condylostylus pectinatus Becker, 1922
Condylostylus pedestris Becker, 1922
Condylostylus penicilliger (Enderlein, 1912)
Condylostylus pennatus Parent, 1929
Condylostylus pennifer (Aldrich, 1901)
Condylostylus perforatus Parent, 1934
Condylostylus perplexus (Parent, 1933)
Condylostylus perspicuus Becker, 1922
Condylostylus pilipes (Macquart, 1842)
Condylostylus pilosus (Loew, 1861)
Condylostylus plagiochaetus (Meuffels & Grootaert, 2007)
Condylostylus plumitarsis Parent, 1933
Condylostylus plutus Parent, 1929
Condylostylus posticatus (Wiedemann, 1830)
Condylostylus praestans (Aldrich, 1901)
Condylostylus pressitarsus Parent, 1931
Condylostylus pretiosus (Walker, 1849)
Condylostylus productipes Parent, 1934
Condylostylus profundus Becker, 1922
Condylostylus pruinifrons Parent, 1929
Condylostylus pruinosus (Coquillett, 1904)
Condylostylus pseudoparicoxa Grichanov, 1999
Condylostylus pulchripes Becker, 1922
Condylostylus pulchritarsis Van Duzee, 1931
Condylostylus punctumalbum Parent, 1929
Condylostylus purpuratus (Aldrich, 1901)
Condylostylus purpureus (Aldrich, 1901)
Condylostylus quadricolor (Walker, 1849)
Condylostylus quadriseriatus Robinson, 1975
Condylostylus rex Parent, 1929
Condylostylus rubrocauda Van Duzee, 1931
Condylostylus salti (Van Duzee, 1929)
Condylostylus scaber (Loew, 1861)
Condylostylus schmidti (Parent, 1954)
Condylostylus schnusei Becker, 1922
Condylostylus selectus Parent, 1931
Condylostylus selitskayae Grichanov, 1998
Condylostylus semiciliatus (Van Duzee, 1929)
Condylostylus seminiger Becker, 1922
Condylostylus serenus Becker, 1922
Condylostylus setifer Parent, 1929
Condylostylus setitarsis Van Duzee, 1931
Condylostylus simplex Becker, 1922
Condylostylus sinclairi Grichanov, 2000
Condylostylus singularis Becker, 1922
Condylostylus sinuatus (Macquart, 1842)
Condylostylus sipho (Say, 1823)
Condylostylus skufjini Grichanov, 1998
Condylostylus squamifer Becker, 1922
Condylostylus stigma (Fabricius, 1805)
Condylostylus striatipennis Becker, 1922
Condylostylus subcordatus Becker, 1922
Condylostylus subgeniculatus Yang & Saigusa, 2005
Condylostylus sumptuosus Parent, 1929
Condylostylus superbus (Wiedemann, 1830)
Condylostylus superfluus (Schiner, 1868)
Condylostylus surinamensis Parent, 1928
Condylostylus tarsatus Van Duzee, 1932
Condylostylus tenebrosus (Walker, 1857)
Condylostylus tenuipes Becker, 1922
Condylostylus tenuis (Van Duzee, 1933)
Condylostylus terciliatus Parent, 1928
Condylostylus terminalis Becker, 1922
Condylostylus tibialis (Wiedemann, 1830)
Condylostylus tonsus (Aldrich, 1901)
Condylostylus trimaculatus Van Duzee, 1931
Condylostylus triseriatus (Aldrich, 1901)
Condylostylus tumantumari Curran, 1925
Condylostylus ulrichi Grichanov, 2000
Condylostylus umbrinervis Parent, 1933
Condylostylus unguipes Becker, 1922
Condylostylus uniseriatus Becker, 1922
Condylostylus varitibia Van Duzee, 1932
Condylostylus victorisetae Hollis, 1964
Condylostylus vietnamensis Li, Li & Yang, 2012
Condylostylus vigilans Becker, 1922
Condylostylus villosus Parent, 1928
Condylostylus violaceus (Macquart, 1842)
Condylostylus viridicoxa (Aldrich, 1904)
Condylostylus viridis Parent, 1929
Condylostylus xixianus Yang & Saigusa, 2000
Condylostylus xizangensis Zhu & Yang, 2007
Condylostylus yaromi Grichanov, 1999
Condylostylus yunnanensis Zhu & Yang, 2007

Unrecognised species:
 Condylostylus femoratus (Say, 1823)
 Condylostylus imperfectus Becker, 1922
 Condylostylus inficitus (Walker, 1849)
 Condylostylus nitidus (Walker, 1852)
 Condylostylus pleuralis (Thomson, 1869)
 Condylostylus stigma (Wiedemann, 1830)

Species considered nomina dubia:
 Condylostylus amoris (Walker, 1849)
 Condylostylus anceps (Wiedemann, 1830)
 Condylostylus clathratus (Macquart, 1842)
 Condylostylus detegendus Parent, 1935
 Condylostylus dux (Wiedemann, 1830)
 Condylostylus equestris (Fabricius, 1775)
 Condylostylus flavizonatus Parent, 1954
 Condylostylus guyanensis (Macquart, 1842)
 Condylostylus haereticus (Walker, 1860)
 Condylostylus hirtulus (Bigot, 1888)
 Condylostylus incisuralis (Macquart, 1845)
 Condylostylus leprieuri (Macquart, 1842)
 Condylostylus pampoecilus (Bigot, 1888)
 Condylostylus permodicus (Walker, 1860)
 Condylostylus polychromus (Bigot, 1890)
 Condylostylus portoricensis (Macquart, 1834)
 Condylostylus pulcher (Wiedemann, 1830)
 Condylostylus smaragdulus (Wiedemann, 1830)
 Condylostylus solidus (Walker, 1860)
 Condylostylus suavium (Walker, 1849)

Species considered nomina nuda:
 Condylostylus inconstans Becker, 1918
 Condylostylus simplicitarsis Becker, 1922

The following species are synonyms of other species:
 Condylostylus acuminatus Van Duzee, 1930: Synonym of C. erectus Becker, 1922
 Condylostylus albicoxa (Walker, 1849): Synonym of C. caudatus (Wiedemann, 1830)
 Condylostylus astequinus (Bigot, 1888): Synonym of C. quadricolor (Walker, 1849)
 Condylostylus barbipes Van Duzee, 1934: Synonym of C. imperialis (Fabricius, 1805)
 Condylostylus barbitarsus Parent, 1928: Synonym of C. brevimanus (Enderlein, 1912)
 Condylostylus chalybeus (Van Duzee, 1914): Synonym of C. comatus (Loew, 1861)
 Condylostylus ciliatus Parent, 1929 (preoccupied by C. ciliatus (Loew, 1861)): Renamed to C. blepharotarsis Meuffels & Grootaert, 1999
 Condylostylus clunalis (Coquillett, 1902): Synonym of C. atrolamellatus (Aldrich, 1901)
 Condylostylus congensis Curran, 1927: synonym of C. beckeri Speiser, 1920
 Condylostylus currani Parent, 1929: Synonym of C. melampus (Loew, 1862)
 Condylostylus debilis Becker, 1922: Synonym of C. crinitus (Aldrich, 1904)
 Condylostylus decoripes Becker, 1922: Synonym of C. forcipatus (Aldrich, 1901)
 Condylostylus digitatus (Van Duzee, 1914): Synonym of C. quadricolor (Walker, 1849)
 Condylostylus flavimanus (Macquart, 1842): Synonym of C. longicornis (Fabricius, 1775)
 Condylostylus furcillatus Parent, 1928: Synonym of C. atrolamellatus (Aldrich, 1901)
 Condylostylus imitans Curran, 1926 (preoccupied by C. imitans Curran, 1925): Renamed to C. erroneus Grichanov, 2004
 Condylostylus insolitus Van Duzee, 1930: Synonym of C. subcordatus Becker, 1922
 Condylostylus jucundus (Loew, 1861): Synonym of C. quadricolor (Walker, 1849)
 Condylostylus longiseta (Coquillett, 1902): Synonym of C. depressus (Aldrich, 1901)
 Condylostylus metallifer (Walker, 1849): Synonym of C. longicornis (Fabricius, 1775)
 Condylostylus nigripes (Macquart, 1842): Synonym of C. longicornis (Fabricius, 1775)
 Condylostylus nigritibia Van Duzee, 1932: Synonym of C. quadricolor (Walker, 1849)
 Condylostylus nitidicauda (Van Duzee, 1929): Synonym of C. atrolamellatus (Aldrich, 1901)
 Condylostylus panamensis (Van Duzee, 1929): Synonym of C. purpureus (Aldrich, 1901)
 Condylostylus peractus (Walker, 1860): Synonym of C. mundus (Wiedemann, 1830)
 Condylostylus perpilosus Robinson, 1975: Synonym of C. albiciliatus (Van Duzee, 1927)
 Condylostylus pilicornis (Aldrich, 1904): Synonym of C. occidentalis (Bigot, 1888)
 Condylostylus quintusflavus Gunther, 1980: Synonym of C. caudatus (Wiedemann, 1830)
 Condylostylus radians (Macquart, 1834): Synonym of C. longicornis (Fabricius, 1775)
 Condylostylus retrociliatus Parent, 1931: Synonym of C. atrolamellatus (Aldrich, 1901)
 Condylostylus saccicauda Parent, 1934: Synonym of C. perspicuus Becker, 1922
 Condylostylus semicomatus (Van Duzee, 1929): Synonym of C. villosus Parent, 1928
 Condylostylus sexsetosus Van Duzee, 1931: Synonym of C. forcipatus (Aldrich, 1901)
 Condylostylus simulans (Van Duzee, 1929): Synonym of C. atrolamellatus (Aldrich, 1901)
 Condylostylus tenuimanus Van Duzee, 1931: Synonym of C. graenicheri (Van Duzee, 1927)
 Condylostylus trichosoma (Bigot, 1890): Synonym of C. longicornis (Fabricius, 1775)
 Condylostylus vagans Becker, 1922: Synonym of C. forcipatus (Aldrich, 1901)
 Condylostylus villosipes Parent, 1933: Synonym of C. imperialis (Fabricius, 1805)

References 

 Nearctic

Dolichopodidae genera
Sciapodinae
Diptera of Australasia
Diptera of Africa
Diptera of North America
Diptera of South America
Diptera of Asia
Taxa named by Jacques-Marie-Frangile Bigot